The Gypsum Cave Mine is a gypsum-anhydrite and uranium mine located in Clark County, Nevada, United States, on the Intermontane Plateaus,  east of North Las Vegas.

Description
The mines primary products are gypsum and anhydrite, and its tertiary product is uranium. It is managed by the Bureau of Land Management. The excavation of its primary products is considered viable, but not the case for its uranium. The Gypsum Cave Mine is also located a mile (1.6 km) northeast the Gypsum Cave, which is a limestone cave that is listed on the National Register of Historic Places.

See also

References

Gypsum caves
Mines in Nevada
Caves of Nevada
Underground mines in the United States